The Journal of the American Oil Chemists' Society is a peer-reviewed scientific journal published by Wiley and the American Oil Chemists' Society. The journal publishes original research articles, letters, and invited reviews in the area of science and technology of oils, fats, oilseed proteins, and related materials.

Impact factor 
The Journal of the American Oil Chemists' Society has a 2014 impact factor of 1.541

Editor 
The editor in chief of the journal is Richard W. Hartel (University of Wisconsin).

Abstracting and indexing
 Science Citation Index 
 Journal Citation Reports / Science Edition,
 Current Contents / Agriculture, Biology & Environmental Sciences 
 Scopus 
 Inspec 
 Chemical Abstracts Service 
 CSA Illumina 
 CAB International 
 Academic OneFile 
 AGRICOLA 
 Biochemistry and Biophysics Citation Index 
 Biological Abstracts 
 BIOSIS Previews 
 Business Source 
 CAB Abstracts 
 Chimica 
 Engineering Index / Compendex 
 Food Science and Technology Abstracts 
 Global Health 
 INIS / Atomindex 
 OmniFile 
 PASCAL 
 Reaction Citation Index 
 Reaxys 
 Summon by Serial Solutions

References

External links 

Wiley-Blackwell academic journals
Chemistry journals
Publications established in 1924
Monthly journals
English-language journals